Gibbobruchus mimus, the redbud bruchid, is a species of pea or bean weevil in the family Chrysomelidae. It is found in Central America and North America.

References

Further reading

External links

 

Bruchinae
Articles created by Qbugbot
Beetles described in 1831